Serravalle Sesia is a comune (municipality) in the Province of Vercelli in the Italian region Piedmont, located about  northeast of Turin and about  north of Vercelli.

The current comune was created in 1927 from the towns of Serravalle, Bornate and Vintebbio.

References

External links
 Official website

Cities and towns in Piedmont